Chishtian (Punjabi) is a city in Bahawalnagar district in Punjab Province, Pakistan. For administrative purposes, it is a part of the similarly named Chishtian Tehsil. It is the 59th largest city of Pakistan by population.

Education
 Daanish Schools
 Government Post Graduate College for Girls

Healthcare
A branch of the Shaukat Khanum Memorial Cancer Hospital & Research Centre is based in Chishtian.

Religion

The city experienced armed sectarian violence in 2013 between Sunni and Shia Muslims. The local authorities called in the Pakistan Army to bring order to the situation, which may have been a reaction to similar violence in Rawalpindi on the preceding day.

References

Populated places in Bahawalnagar District
Cities in Pakistan
Cities and towns in Punjab, Pakistan
Cities and towns in Bahawalnagar District
Chishti Order